Run Run Shaw Creative Media Centre is an academic building on the campus of the City University of Hong Kong, which was completed in 2011. It was designed by Daniel Libeskind cooperating with Leigh and Orange Ltd., and received several awards on its design.  It was funded with a donation of HK$100 million from the Shaw Foundation and is named after Run Run Shaw.    The building houses the university's School of Creative Media, the Centre for Applied Computing and Interactive Media and the computer science, media and communication, and English departments.

References

External links
Run Run Shaw Creative Media Centre

2011 establishments in Hong Kong
Buildings and structures in Hong Kong
City University of Hong Kong
Educational buildings
Education in Hong Kong
Kowloon Tong
Sham Shui Po District